Richard 'Dick' Powell (1864-11 January 1944) was a Welsh international rugby union forward who played club rugby for Abergavenny and Newport.

Rugby career
Powell was first selected for Wales for a match against Scotland at Rodney Parade, as part of the 1888 Home Nations Championship. Under the captaincy of Tom Clapp, Wales won their very first match over Scotland, thanks to a first-half Thomas Pryce-Jenkins try. Powell was reselected for the very next Wales game away to Ireland at Lansdowne Road. Wales lost heavily and Powell was one of eight Welsh players who would never represent their country again.

International matches played
Wales
  1888
  1888

Bibliography

References

1864 births
1944 deaths
Abergavenny RFC players
Newport RFC players
Rugby union forwards
Rugby union players from Abergavenny
Wales international rugby union players
Welsh rugby union players